John Clare (13 July 1793 – 20 May 1864) was an English poet. The son of a farm labourer, he became known for his celebrations of the English countryside and sorrows at its disruption. His work underwent major re-evaluation in the late 20th century; he is now often seen as a major 19th-century poet. His biographer Jonathan Bate called Clare "the greatest labouring-class poet that England has ever produced. No one has ever written more powerfully of nature, of a rural childhood, and of the alienated and unstable self."

Life

Early life
Clare was born in Helpston,  to the north of the city of Peterborough. In his lifetime, the village was in the Soke of Peterborough in Northamptonshire and his memorial calls him "The Northamptonshire Peasant Poet". Helpston is now part of the City of Peterborough unitary authority.

Clare became an agricultural labourer while still a child, but attended school in Glinton church until he was 12. In his early adult years, Clare became a potboy in the Blue Bell public house and fell in love with Mary Joyce, but her father, a prosperous farmer, forbade them to meet. Later he was a gardener at Burghley House. He enlisted in the militia, tried camp life with Gypsies, and worked in Pickworth, Rutland as a lime burner in 1817. In the following year he was obliged to accept parish relief. Malnutrition stemming from childhood may have been the main factor behind his five-foot stature and contributed to his poor physical health in later life.

Early poems
Clare had bought a copy of James Thomson's The Seasons and began to write poems and sonnets. In an attempt to hold off his parents' eviction from their home, Clare offered his poems to a local bookseller, Edward Drury, who sent them to his cousin, John Taylor of the Taylor & Hessey firm, which had published the work of John Keats. Taylor published Clare's Poems Descriptive of Rural Life and Scenery in 1820. The book was highly praised and the next year his Village Minstrel and Other Poems appeared. "There was no limit to the applause bestowed upon Clare, unanimous in their admiration of a poetical genius coming before them in the humble garb of a farm labourer."

Middle life

On 16 March 1820 Clare married Martha ("Patty") Turner, a milkmaid, in the Church of St Peter and St Paul in Great Casterton. An annuity of 15 guineas from the Marquess of Exeter, in whose service he had been, was supplemented by subscription, so that Clare gained £45 a year, a sum far beyond what he had ever earned. Soon, however, his income became insufficient and in 1823 he was nearly penniless. The Shepherd's Calendar (1827) met with little success, which was not increased by his hawking it himself. As he worked again in the fields his health temporarily improved; but he soon became seriously ill. Earl Fitzwilliam presented him with a new cottage and a piece of ground, but Clare could not settle down there.

Clare was constantly torn between the two worlds of literary London and his often illiterate neighbours, between a need to write poetry and a need for money to feed and clothe his children. His health began to suffer and he had bouts of depression, which worsened after his sixth child was born in 1830 and as his poetry sold less well. In 1832, his friends and London patrons clubbed together to move the family to a larger cottage with a smallholding in the village of Northborough, not far from Helpston. However, he only felt more alienated there.

Clare's last work, the Rural Muse (1835), was noticed favourably by Christopher North and other reviewers, but its sales were not enough to support his wife and seven children. Clare's mental health began to worsen. His alcohol consumption steadily increased along with dissatisfaction with his own identity and more erratic behaviour. A notable instance was his interruption of a performance of The Merchant of Venice, in which Clare verbally assaulted Shylock. He was becoming a burden to Patty and his family, and in July 1837, on the recommendation of his publishing friend, John Taylor, Clare went of his own volition (accompanied by a friend of Taylor's) to Dr Matthew Allen's private asylum High Beach near Loughton, in Epping Forest. Taylor had assured Clare that he would receive the best medical care.

Clare was reported as being "full of many strange delusions". He believed himself to be a prize fighter and that he had two wives, Patty and Mary. He started to claim he was Lord Byron. Allen wrote about Clare to The Times in 1840:
 
It is most singular that ever since he came... the moment he gets pen or pencil in hand he begins to write most poetical effusions. Yet he has never been able to obtain in conversation, nor even in writing prose, the appearance of sanity for two minutes or two lines together, and yet there is no indication of insanity in any of his poetry.

Religion
Clare was an Anglican. Whatever he may have felt about liturgy and ministry, and however critical an eye he may have cast on parish life, Clare retained and replicated his father's loyalty to the Church of England. He dodged services in his youth and dawdled in the fields during the hours of worship, but he derived much help in later years from members of the clergy. He acknowledged that his father "was brought up in the communion of the Church of England, and I have found no cause to withdraw myself from it." If he found aspects of the established church uncongenial and awkward, he remained prepared to defend it: "Still I reverence the church and do from my soul as much as anyone curse the hand that's lifted to undermine its constitution."

Much of Clare's imagery was drawn from the Old Testament (e.g. "The Peasant Poet"). However, Clare also honours the figure of Christ in poems such as "The Stranger".

Later life

During his early asylum years in High Beach, Essex (1837–1841), Clare re-wrote poems and sonnets by Lord Byron. Child Harold, his version of Byron's Childe Harold's Pilgrimage, became a lament for past lost love, and Don Juan, A Poem an acerbic, misogynistic, sexualised rant redolent of an ageing dandy. Clare also took credit for Shakespeare's plays, claiming to be him. "I'm John Clare now," the poet told a newspaper editor, "I was Byron and Shakespeare formerly."

In July 1841, Clare absconded from the asylum in Essex and walked some  home, believing he was to meet his first love Mary Joyce, to whom he was convinced he was married. He did not believe her family when they told him she had died accidentally three years earlier in a house fire. He remained free, mostly at home in Northborough, for the five months following, but eventually Patty called the doctors.

Between Christmas and New Year, 1841, Clare was committed to Northampton General Lunatic Asylum (now St Andrew's Hospital). On his arrival at the asylum, the accompanying doctor, Fenwick Skrimshire, having treated Clare since 1820, completed the admission papers. Asked, "Was the insanity preceded by any severe or long-continued mental emotion or exertion?"  Skrimshire entered: "After years of poetical prosing."

His maintenance at the asylum was paid for by Earl Fitzwilliam, "but at the ordinary rate for poor people". He remained there for the rest of his life under the humane regime of Thomas Octavius Prichard, who encouraged and helped him to write. Here he wrote possibly his most famous poem, "I Am". It was in this later poetry that Clare "developed a very distinctive voice, an unmistakable intensity and vibrance, such as the later pictures of Van Gogh" possessed.

John Clare died of a stroke on 20 May 1864 in his 71st year. His remains were returned to Helpston for burial in St Botolph's churchyard, where he had expressed a wish to be buried.

Remembrance
On Clare's birthday, children at the John Clare School, Helpston's primary, parade through the village and place their "midsummer cushions" around his gravestone, which bears the inscriptions "To the Memory of John Clare The Northamptonshire Peasant Poet" and "A Poet is Born not Made".

Poetry

In his time, Clare was commonly known as "the Northamptonshire Peasant Poet". His formal education was brief, his other employment and class origins lowly. Clare resisted the use of the increasingly standardised English grammar and orthography in his poetry and prose, alluding to political reasoning in comparing "grammar" (in a wider sense of orthography) to tyrannical government and slavery, personifying it in jocular fashion as a "bitch". He wrote in Northamptonshire dialect, introducing local words to the literary canon such as "pooty" (snail), "lady-cow" (ladybird), "crizzle" (to crisp) and "throstle" (song thrush).

In early life he struggled to find a place for his poetry in the changing literary fashions of the day. He also felt that he did not belong with other peasants. As Clare once wrote:"I live here among the ignorant like a lost man in fact like one whom the rest seemes careless of having anything to do with—they hardly dare talk in my company for fear I should mention them in my writings and I find more pleasure in wandering the fields than in musing among my silent neighbours who are insensible to everything but toiling and talking of it and that to no purpose."

It is common to see an absence of punctuation in Clare's original writings, although many publishers felt the need to remedy this in most of his work. Clare argued with his editors about how it should be presented to the public.

Clare grew up in a time of massive changes in town and countryside as the Industrial Revolution swept Europe. Many former agricultural and craft workers, including children, moved from the countryside to crowded cities, as factory work mechanized. The Agricultural Revolution saw pastures ploughed up, trees and hedges uprooted, fens drained and commons enclosed. This destruction of an ancient way of life distressed Clare. His political and social views were mainly conservative. ("I am as far as my politics reaches 'King and Country' – no Innovations in Religion and Government say I.") He refused even to complain of the subordinate position to which English society had placed him, swearing that "with the old dish that was served to my forefathers I am content."

His early work expresses delight in nature and the cycle of the rural year. Poems such as "Winter Evening", "Haymaking" and "Wood Pictures in Summer" mark the beauty of the world and the certainties of rural life, where animals must be fed and crops harvested. Poems such as "Little Trotty Wagtail" show his sharp observation of wildlife, though "The Badger" shows a lack of sentiment about the place of animals in the countryside. At this time he often used poetic forms such as the sonnet and the rhyming couplet. His later poetry tends to be more meditative and use forms similar to the folk songs and ballads of his youth. An example of this is "Evening".

Clare's knowledge of the natural world went far beyond that of the major Romantic poets. However, poems such as "I Am" show a metaphysical depth parallel with his contemporary poets and many of his pre-asylum poems deal with intricate play on the nature of linguistics. His "bird's nest poems", it can be argued, display the self-awareness and obsession with the creative process that captivated the romantics. Clare was the most influential poet, apart from Wordsworth, to prefer an older style.

In a foreword to the 2011 anthology The Poetry of Birds, the broadcaster and bird-watcher Tim Dee notes that Clare wrote about 147 species of British wild birds "without any technical kit whatsoever".

Essays
The only Clare essay to appear in his lifetime was "Popularity of Authorship", which described anonymously his predicament in 1824. Other essays by Clare to appear posthumously were "Essays on Landscape", "Essays on Criticism and Fashion", "Recollections on a Journey from Essex", "Excursions with an Angler", "For Essay on Modesty and Mock Morals", "For Essay on Industry", "Keats", "Byron", "The Dream", "House or Window Flies" and "Dewdrops".

Revived interest
Clare was relatively forgotten in the later 19th century, but interest in his work was revived by Arthur Symons in 1908, Edmund Blunden in 1920 and John and Anne Tibble in their ground-breaking 1935 two-volume edition, while in 1949 Geoffrey Grigson edited as Poems of John Clare's Madness (published by Routledge and Kegan Paul). Benjamin Britten set some of "May" from A Shepherd's Calendar in his Spring Symphony of 1948 and included a setting of The Evening Primrose in his Five Flower Songs.

Copyright on much of his work was claimed after 1965 by the editor of the Complete Poetry, Professor Eric Robinson, but this has been contested. Recent publishers such as Faber and Carcanet have refused to acknowledge it and it seems the copyright is defunct.

The largest collection of original Clare manuscripts is held at Peterborough Museum and Art Gallery, where items are available to view by appointment.

Altering what Clare actually wrote continued into the later 20th century. Helen Gardner, for instance, amended both the punctuation and the spelling and grammar when editing the New Oxford Book of English Verse 1250–1950 (1972).

Since 1993, the John Clare Society of North America has organised an annual session of scholarly papers concerning John Clare at the annual Convention of the Modern Language Association of America. In 2003 the scholar Jonathan Bate published the first major critical biography of Clare, which helped to keep up the revival in popular and academic interest.

John Clare Cottage

The thatched cottage where Clare was born was bought by the John Clare Trust in 2005. In May 2007 the Trust gained £1.27 million of funding from the Heritage Lottery Fund and commissioned Jefferson Sheard Architects to create a new landscape design and visitor centre, including a cafe, shop and exhibition area. The cottage at 12 Woodgate, Helpston, has been restored using traditional building methods and is open to the public. In 2013 the John Clare Trust received a further grant from the Heritage Lottery Fund to help preserve the building and provide educational activities for youngsters visiting it.

Works
Autumn
First Love
Nightwind
Snow Storm.
The Firetail.
The Badger – Date unknown
The Lament of Swordy Well
Sunday Dip.

Poetry collections
In chronological order:
Poems Descriptive of Rural Life and Scenery. London, 1820
The Village Minstrel, and Other Poems. London, 1821
The Shepherd's Calendar with Village Stories and Other Poems. London, 1827
The Rural Muse. London, 1835
Sonnet. London 1841
Poems by John Clare. Arthur Symons (Ed.) London, 1908
The Poems of John Clare - In two volumes. London, 1935
Selected Poems London, 1997

Works about Clare

In chronological order:
Frederick Martin, The Life of John Clare, 1865
J. L. Cherry, Life and Remains of John Clare, 1873

Norman Gale, Clare's Poems, 1901
June Wilson, Green Shadows: The Life of John Clare, 1951
John Barrell, The Idea of Landscape and the Sense of Place, 1730-1840:  An Approach to the Poetry of John Clare, Cambridge University Press, 1972
Edward Bond, The Fool, 1975
Greg Crossan, A Relish for Eternity: The Process of Divinization in the Poetry of John Clare, 1976, 
H. O. Dendurent, John Clare: A Reference Guide, Boston: G. K. Hall, 1978
Edward Storey, A Right to Song: The Life of John Clare, London: Methuen, 1982, 
Timothy Brownlow, John Clare and Picturesque Landscape, 1983
John MacKenna, Clare: a novel, Belfast: The Blackstaff Press, 1993,  (fictional biography)
Hugh Haughton, Adam Phillips and Geoffrey Summerfield, John Clare in Context, Cambridge University Press, 1994, 
Simon Kövesi, John Clare: Nature, Criticism and History, London: Palgrave, 2017, 
Alan Moore, Voice of the Fire (Chapter 10 only), UK: Victor Gollancz
John Goodridge and Simon Kovesi (eds), John Clare: New Approaches, John Clare Society, 2000
Jonathan Bate, John Clare, London: Picador, 2003
Alan B. Vardy, John Clare, Politics and Poetry, London: Palgrave MacMillan, 2003
Iain Sinclair, Edge of The Orison: In the Traces of John Clare's "Journey Out of Essex", Hamish Hamilton, 2005
John MacKay, Inscription and Modernity: From Wordsworth to Mandelstam, Bloomington: Indiana University Press, 2006, .
David Powell, First Publications of John Clare's Poems, John Clare Society of North America, 2009
Carry Akroyd, "Natures Powers & Spells": Landscape Change, John Clare and Me, Langford Press, 2009, 
Judith Allnatt, The Poet's Wife, Doubleday, 2010 (fiction), 
Adam Foulds, The Quickening Maze, Jonathan Cape, 2009
D. C. Moore, Town (Play)
Sarah Houghton-Walker, John Clare's Religion, Routledge, 2016, 
Adam White, John Clare's Romanticism, London: Palgrave Macmillan, 2017

John Clare and music 
Clare's father was, according to Clare, a 'noted singer', and Clare himself played the fiddle and collected folk songs and tunes. Regarding his fiddle playing ability, he described himself as "a decent scraper", and collected over two-hundred folk tunes in two books, the Northampton Manuscripts Nos. 12 and 13.

As well as collecting folk tunes, Clare also collected many folk songs which are recorded in the Northampton Manuscript No. 18, and the Peterborough Manuscripts B4 and B7. According to George Deacon, the Northampton Manuscript No. 18 contains "more polished and refined versions" of songs which were originally written up in a rougher form in the two Peterborough Manuscripts, B4 and B7. Deacon's research led him to view the two Peterborough manuscripts as more authentic, inasmuch as they showed, "less conscious interference from the poet in Clare" than the versions of the songs in the Northampton manuscript.

Since Clare's death, many of his poems have been set to music by classical composers, and, more recently, by contemporary singer/songwriters working in the acoustic and folk genres. However, at least one of Clare's poems was set to music in his lifetime, although Clare arrived in London too late to attend the performance. According to Professor Simon Kövesi, "The Meeting ... [was] Clare’s first poem to be set to music and performed on stage. The performance by singer Madame Vestris was at Drury Lane Theatre on 19 February 1820; the song was threaded into the pasticcio opera The Siege of Belgrade. Clare just missed the show, arriving in London for his first visit to the capital a short while after. Clare wrote that ‘on the night we got into London it was announcd in the Play Bills that a song of mine was to be sung at Covent Garden by Madam Vestris and we was to have gone but it was too late. I felt uncommonly pleasd at the circumstance’."

Songs and tunes collected by Clare in the Northampton Catalogue 
The Catalogue of the John Clare Collection in the Northampton Public Library with Indexes to the Poems in Manuscript was compiled by David Powell and published by the County Borough of Northampton, Public Libraries, Museums and Art Gallery Committee in 1964. Included in the catalogue are the two books of folk tunes (MSS 12 & 13) and the book of folk songs (MSS 18).

John Clare, Northampton Manuscript No. 12 
Catalogue entry reads:

"A small oblong music book of song and dance tunes, inscribed on p.1 ‘John Clare / Helpstone / 1818’ and entitled on p.3 A Collection / of Songs / Airs and Dances / For the Violin.

3¾″ × 6¼″, 82 pp., red quarter-leather with marbled boards.

Contents consist of eighty-eight titles, but the tunes are without words and directions. The titles are noted down in Clare's hand. This is No. 109 in the Peterborough Centenary Catalogue."

John Clare, Northampton Manuscript No. 13 
Catalogue entry reads:

"An oblong music book of song and dance tunes. Undated.

5¾″ × 9½″, 56 pp., blue paper covers.

Contents consist of 180 titles. Directions for some of the country dances are given in abbreviated form, but the only words given are those for Black Ey'd Susan and Dibdin's The Sailors Journal. The titles are noted down in Clare's hand. A few fragmentary lines of verse are scribbled inside the back cover. This is No. 108 in the Peterborough Centenary Catalogue."

John Clare, Northampton Manuscript No.18 
Catalogue entry reads:

"A small oblong notebook, entitled Old Songs & Ballads, which Clare was using in 1827–8.

4″ × 6¼″, 34 pp. (+146 blank), worn brown half-calf with marbled boards.

The introduction begins: ‘I commenced sometime ago with an intention of making a collection of old Ballads . . .’, and contents include John Randall, The Maidens Welcome, The False Knights Tradegy, Loves Riddles, Banks of Ivory, etc. There is an additional poem, Round Oak, in pencil and several of the blank pages at the end contain traces of pencil writing which has been erased. This is No. 98 in the Peterborough Centenary Catalogue."

Recordings of songs and tunes collected by Clare 
in chronological order:
 George Deacon, Dream Not of Love: 17 Songs from John Clare, album, 2002
 Decent Scrapers, The John Clare Project: music from the John Clare manuscripts, album, 2015
 Becky Dellow plays numerous tunes collected by Clare in: Becky Dellow & Adam Horovitz, The Thunder Mutters, podcast (episodes 1, 3, 5, 7, 9-13, 15-17), 2020-2021

Musical settings of Clare's poems 
in chronological order:

 Benjamin Britten, The Evening Primrose, song, from Five Flower Songs, choral composition for SATB, 1950
 Malcolm Arnold, John Clare Cantata, for SATB and piano duet, 1955
 Trevor Hold, Three Songs of the Countryside, for 2 equal voices and piano to poems by ‘BB’, John Clare and the composer, 1962
 Trevor Hold, For John Clare, for tenor and instrumental ensemble, 1964
 Richard Rodney Bennett, The Insect World & Clock-a-clay, from The Insect World, song cycle for unison voices and piano, 1966
 Richard Rodney Bennett, The Bird's Lament & The Early Nightingale, from The Aviary, song cycle for unison voices and piano, 1966
 Trevor Hold, Gathered from the Field, Seven songs for tenor and piano to poems by John Clare, 1975
 Michael Hurd, The Shepherd's Calendar, choral symphony for baritone solo, SATB chorus and orchestra, 1975
 Terence Greaves, Three Rustic Poems Of John Clare, for soprano voice and clarinet in A, 1976
 Royston Wood & Heather Wood, The Cellar Door, song, from the album No Relation, 1977
 Trevor Hold, A John Clare Songbook, Nine songs for high voice and piano to poems by John Clare, 1980
 Judith Bingham, A Winter Scene from A Cold Spell – 5 Carols for Winter, for SSAATTBB unaccompanied choir, 1987
 Vikki Clayton, Midsummer Cushion, album (tracks 1-3, 5-9), 1991
 Trevor Hold, A Little Songbook for John Clare, Five songs for soprano and piano to poems by John Clare, 1993
 Gordon Tyrrall, A Distance from the Town: A musical appreciation of the work of the poet John Clare, album (tracks 1, 3-4, 6-7, 9-10, 12-13, 17, 19-20), 1998
 John Wright, Song (Heaven to Be Near Thee), song, from the album A Few Short Lines, 1999
 Terence Deadman, Eight Song Settings from the Poems of John Clare, compositions for tenor and piano, 2005
 Steeleye Span, Ned Ludd Part 1 (Inclosure), song, from the album Bloody Men, 2006
 Chris Wood, I Am, song, from the album None the Wiser, 2013
 Andy Turner, The Crow Sat on the Willow, song, 2018
 Andy Turner, The Gipsey's Song, song, 2019
 Robert Farmer, John Clare - Songs from the Shepherd's Calendar, album, 2021

Songs about, inspired by, or containing references to Clare 
in chronological order:
 Chris Wood, Mad John, song, from the album Trespasser, 2008
 Pennyless, John Clare, song, from the album Strange Dreams, 2019

More information about Clare and music 
in chronological order:

 George Deacon, John Clare and the Folk Tradition, Sinclair Browne Ltd, 1983
 BBC Radio 4, John Clare's Playlist, 2013
 Derek B. Scott, John Clare and Folksong, 2015
 Tony Urbainczyk & Rose Urbainczyk, John Clare - poet and fiddler, 1793-1864, 2015
 BBC Radio 4, John Clare's Scraping, 2020
 Becky Dellow & Adam Horovitz, The Thunder Mutters, podcast (episodes 1, 3, 5, 7, 9-13, 15-17), 2020-2021
 Simon Kövesi, Julian Philips, & Toby Jones, The Meeting: A panel discussion on John Clare, his poetry and music, 2021

See also
Chauncy Hare Townshend
Political poetry
Proletarian poetry
Proletarian literature

References

External links

The John Clare Society
The John Clare Society of North America
Clare Cottage, Helpston
The John Clare Page, chronology, poems, images, essays, bibliography, press coverage, links, etc.
The 1824 essay "Popularity in Authorship" introduced by the poet John Birtwhistle. [Archived]
John Clare's family researching and challenging stigma

Index entry for John Clare at Poets' Corner

19th-century English poets
Victorian poets
Sonneteers
People from Northamptonshire (before 1974)
Romantic poets
People with mood disorders
1793 births
1864 deaths
English male poets